Ominous Horizons: A Paladin's Calling is a 3D medieval first-person shooter video game developed by N'Lightning Software Development and released in September 2001. The game is the spiritual successor to Catechumen (2000). Ominous Horizons cost over $1.6 million over the course of the game's development cycle, being the highest budgeted Christian video game. The game's sales performance was poor, selling only 50,000 copies.

Plot 

The game casts the player as an assistant to Johannes Gutenberg, publisher of the Gutenberg Bible. The master copy of the Gutenburg Bible has been stolen by one of Satan's minions. It is up to the player to travel the world to find each of the missing sections of the Gutenburg Bible to bring the gospel to Western Civilization.

Gameplay 
Much like its predecessor, Ominous Horizons is a first-person shooter done in the style of Quake or Half-Life. Many of the enemies in the game are either the demon possessed or demons themselves. Most of the levels take place in 15th century castles, hamlets, and dungeons. The environment becomes quite varied as the player goes on, with some levels taking place in real-world locations like Stone Henge, the Egyptian Great Sphinx, and one level taking place in a haunted house, as the player desperately searches all ends of the Earth for the missing sections of the Gutenburg Bible.

References

External links 
 

2001 video games
Christian video games
Cultural depictions of Johannes Gutenberg
First-person shooters
Video games based on mythology
Video games developed in the United States
Video games set in the 15th century
Windows games
Windows-only games
Single-player video games